The New York & Lake Erie  is a class III railroad operating in Western New York. The NYLE was formed in 1978 to operate a portion of former Erie trackage that Conrail no longer wanted. Today, the railroad operates between Gowanda to Conewango Valley, New York. The main branch of the trackage once connected with the now-WNYP owned (NS-leased) Southern Tier Line in Waterboro. However, that portion of the line (south of Conewango Valley) and the junction at Waterboro were decommissioned several years ago.  The NYLE also operated a branch between Dayton and Salamanca, also connecting with the Southern Tier Line there, until 1990; the portion south of Cattaraugus was torn out and eventually replaced with the Pat McGee Trail in the early 2000s, while the portion north of Cattaraugus was damaged by floods and landslides in the 2010s and is also no longer operational.

NYLE was used as the setting for railroad scenes in the 1987 film Planes, Trains & Automobiles and the railroad tracks and depot in South Dayton, along with other portions of the village, were featured in the 1983 Robert Redford movie The Natural. The NYLE is also the owner and operator of Oil Creek and Titusville Lines, Inc.

The right-of-way was damaged by the 2009 flooding of the Cattaraugus Creek, resulting in passenger service on the New York & Lake Erie Railroad being suspended until late 2012. As of late 2016, the New York and Lake Erie offers a variety of excursion opportunities throughout the year with most trips ending in either Dayton or South Dayton. Operations south of South Dayton remain suspended, with service to Cherry Creek in the process of being restored.

The NYLE was awarded a NYSDOT grant in June 2016 totaling $732,768 to be put towards a rail rehabilitation project that the railroad will embark on between South Dayton and Cherry Creek. The goal is to replace a switch at the NY&LE's southern end at Waterboro and restore full rail service between Gowanda and Jamestown by 2019, then Buffalo (through a connecting railroad) by 2020. Despite the objections of Cattaraugus County (who accused the railroad of proposing the project as a grant-money scam), the state and city of Jamestown announced its support for a feasibility study for the project in May 2017. As of June 2018, restoration plans for the southern portion of the NYLE remain in the planning stages.

See also

 New York & Lake Erie Railroad

References

New York (state) railroads
Transportation in Cattaraugus County, New York